EP is the first extended play by American rapper Donald Glover under the name Childish Gambino. It was released for free digital download on March 8, 2011. It includes five songs produced by Gambino and Ludwig Göransson. EP preceded the release of Gambino's debut album, Camp (2011), which was released eight months later. On February 2, 2018, nearly 7 years later, the project was re-released for commercial consumption.

Promotion
The second track, "Freaks and Geeks", was released as a music video on February 25, 2011.

Track listing
All tracks written and produced by Childish Gambino and Ludwig Göransson.

References 

2011 debut EPs
Self-released EPs
Donald Glover albums